Convention Center station may refer to:

United States
 Convention Center station (San Diego Trolley), San Diego, California
 Convention Center station (VTA), San Jose, California
 Convention Center station (RTD), Denver, Colorado
 Convention Center station (Jacksonville), Jacksonville, Florida
 Convention Center station (Light RailLink), Baltimore, Maryland
 Convention Center station (Detroit), a Detroit People Mover station in Michigan
 Convention Center station (MetroLink), St. Louis, Missouri
 Convention Center station (TriMet), on the MAX system in Portland, Oregon
 Convention Center station (DART), Dallas, Texas
 Convention Center station (GRTC), Richmond, Virginia
 Convention Center/South 15th Street station, a Link Light Rail station in Tacoma, Washington, United States
 Las Vegas Convention Center (LV Monorail station), a monorail station in Winchester, Nevada, United States

Asia
 Convention Center station (Qingdao Metro), Qingdao, Shandong, China
 Kim Daejung Convention Center station, Gwangju, South Korea
 Queen Sirikit National Convention Centre MRT station, Bangkok ,Thailand
 Shimin Hiroba Station subtitled Convention Center, Kobe ,Japan

See also
 Convention Place station, Seattle, Washington, US
 Convention and Exhibition Center station (disambiguation)
 Convention center